Daniel F. Clark  (December 11, 1954 – September 28, 2014) was a Republican member of the Pennsylvania House of Representatives.

He is a 1972 graduate of East Juniata High School. He earned a degree in accounting from Lycoming College in 1976 and a law degree from Duquesne University School of Law in 1979. He was first elected to represent the 82nd legislative district in the Pennsylvania House of Representatives in 1988. He retired prior to the 2002 election. On September 28, 2014, Clark died of lung cancer at the age of 59.

References

External links
 official PA House profile
 official Party website

1954 births
2014 deaths
People from Juniata County, Pennsylvania
Republican Party members of the Pennsylvania House of Representatives
Lycoming College alumni
Duquesne University School of Law alumni
Pennsylvania lawyers
20th-century American lawyers